Osečina is a town and municipality located in the Kolubara District of western Serbia. As of 2011, the population of the town is 2,730, while population of the municipality is 12,571 inhabitants.

Settlements
Apart from the town of Osečina, the municipality consists of the following villages:

 Bastav
 Belotić
 Bratačić
 Carina
 Dragijevica
 Dragodol
 Gornje Crniljevo
 Gunjaci
 Komirić
 Konjic
 Konjuša
 Lopatanj
 Osečina (village)
 Ostružanj
 Pecka
 Plužac
 Sirdija
 Skadar
 Tuđin

Demographics

According to the 2011 census results, the municipality of Osečina has 12,536 inhabitants.

Ethnic groups
The ethnic composition of the municipality:

Economy
The following table gives a preview of total number of employed people per their core activity (as of 2017):

Gallery

References

External links

 Official website

Populated places in Kolubara District
Municipalities and cities of Šumadija and Western Serbia